Zephyranthes elegans is a species of flowering plants in the Amaryllis family, subfamily Amaryllidoideae. It is native to Bolivia.

References

External links 

 Zephyranthes elegans at the Plant List
 Zephyranthes elegans at Plants Of the World online

elegans
Flora of Bolivia